The Swedish Junior Strokeplay Championship is a national golf tournament in Sweden for golfers under the age of 22, contested for both men and women. 

Known also as the JSM Slag, it has been organized by the Swedish Golf Federation since 1977 when JSM Match, the Swedish Junior Matchplay Championship contested since 1939, switched from match play to stroke play format. Since 2001, both JSM tournaments have been held in parallel.

The number of winners who have gone on to become successful pros is considerable. Anders Forsbrand, Jesper Parnevik and Jonas Blixt have won on the PGA Tour or the World Cup. Liselotte Neumann, Helen Alfredsson and Anna Nordqvist have all won LPGA majors.

Winners

Source:

References

Golf tournaments in Sweden
Junior golf tournaments
Recurring sporting events established in 1977
1977 establishments in Sweden